The karate event at the 2022 Bolivarian Games was held from 25 to 27 June 2022 at the Coliseo Colegio Comfacesar Rodolfo Campo Soto in Valledupar, Colombia.

Medal table

Medalists

Men

Women

References

External links
2022 Bolivarian Games – Karate
Results
Medalists
Draws

Karate
Bolivarian Games